The Gloria Outlets is an outlet store in Zhongli District, Taoyuan, Taiwan. Designed by AO Architects, it is the largest American-style outdoor shopping mall in Taiwan.

History
The overall development consists of a total of three phases. The first phase of the shopping mall opened on December 18, 2015, introducing 102 brands. The second phase was officially opened on December 22, 2016, and 65 more brands were introduced. The third phase started construction on August 9, 2017, and opened 21 months later on May 8, 2019, introducing 285 brands. Some of the shops include Shiatzy Chen, Timberland, Superdry, Nike, and Puma with discounts up to 80% every day.

Gallery

See also
 List of tourist attractions in Taiwan
 TaiMall Shopping Center
 MetroWalk Shopping Center

References

External links

Gloria Outlets Official Website

2015 establishments in Taiwan
Outlet malls in Taiwan
Shopping malls in Taoyuan
Shopping malls established in 2015